Chanti may refer to:

 Chanti (1992 film), a 1992 Telugu film starring Daggubati Venkatesh
 Chanti (2004 film), a 2004 Telugu film starring Ravi Teja
 Angelos Chanti (born 1989), Greek footballer

See also
 Maa Ayana Chanti Pilladu, a 2008 Telugu film directed by Raja Vannem Reddy